"My Kinda Life"  is a song by Cliff Richard from his album Every Face Tells a Story and the second single from the album following the debut single "Hey Mr. Dream Maker". It was released as a single in 1977 reaching No. 15 on the UK singles chart. It peaked at No. 61 in Australia, No. 19 in Belgium, No. 38 in Germany and No. 18 in the Netherlands.

This was Richard's first standard two-song single to be released with a picture sleeve in the UK.

Chart performance

References

Cliff Richard songs
1977 singles
1977 songs
EMI Records singles